, nicknamed Worm,  is a Japanese professional basketball player who plays for Koshigaya Alphas of the B.League in Japan. He played college basketball for Hosei University. He also plays for Japan men's national 3x3 team.

Awards and honors
3x3 Central Europe Tour 2019 - Chance 3x3 Tour Jindřichův Hradec Champions

Career statistics

Regular season 

|-
| align="left" |  2013-14
| align="left" | Otsuka
| 32|| 21|| 29.4|| .410|| .182||.640 || 8.0|| 1.2|| 0.3|| 0.2||  10.3
|-
| align="left" | 2014-15
| align="left" | Otsuka
| 31|| 25|| 29.3|| .432|| .250|| .741|| 7.5|| 2.1|| 0.3|| 0.1|| 12.0
|-
| align="left" | 2015-16
| align="left" | Otsuka
| 35|| 34|| 29.5|| .435|| .328|| .786|| 7.8|| 2.1|| 0.5|| 0.2||  11.5
|-
| align="left" |2016-17
| align="left" | Tochigi
| 4|| || 2.0|| .000|| .000|| .000|| 0.5|| 0.0|| 0.0|| 0.0||  0.0
|-
| align="left" |2017-18
| align="left" | Tochigi
| 24|| || 2.9|| .238|| .400|| .750|| 0.2|| 0.1|| 0.0|| 0.0||  0.6
|-
| align="left" |2018-19
| align="left" | Koshigaya
| 46||13 || 16.5|| .457|| .353|| .663|| 2.9|| 1.2|| 0.2|| 0.1||  6.4
|-
|}

References

External links

1987 births
Living people
Utsunomiya Brex players
Otsuka Corporation Koshigaya Alphas players
Japanese men's basketball players
Japan national 3x3 basketball team players
Basketball players from Tokyo
Forwards (basketball)
3x3 basketball players at the 2020 Summer Olympics
Olympic 3x3 basketball players of Japan